The 1976 Guatemala earthquake struck on February 4 at  with a moment magnitude of 7.5. The shock was centered on the Motagua Fault, about 160 km northeast of Guatemala City at a depth of  near the town of Los Amates in the department of Izabal.

The earthquake ruptured a continuous length of 240 km along the Motagua fault and may have extended further to the east and west but was blocked by vegetation and swamps.

Cities throughout the country suffered damage, and most adobe type houses in the outlying areas of Guatemala City were destroyed. The earthquake struck during the early morning (at 3:01 am, local time) when most people were asleep. This contributed to the high death toll of 23,000. Approximately 76,000 were injured, and many thousands left homeless. Some of the areas affected went without electricity and communications for days.

The main shock was followed by thousands of aftershocks, some of the larger ones causing additional damage and loss of life.

Seismic data 

The quake's epicentre was located near the town of Los Amates, in the eastern part of the Motagua Fault, a left-lateral strike-slip fault that forms part of the tectonic boundary between the North American plate and the Caribbean plate. Ground shaking was felt during approximately 39 seconds, and caused visible rupturing over  along the Motagua fault, while the inferred length of faulting—based on aftershock registration—was estimated at 100 cm.

Maximum seismic intensity (MMI IX) was located in the Mixco area, some sections of Guatemala City and in Gualán. A seismic intensity of MM VI covered an area of 33,000 km2.  Soil liquefaction and sand boils were observed in several locations with high seismic intensity. The main quake activated secondary fault zones, including the Mixco fault, located in a densely populated area just north-west of Guatemala City.

Victims and damage 
The most heavily affected area covered some 30,000 km2, with a population of 2.5 million. Some 23,000 people were reported dead and 77,000 wounded. Approximately 258,000 houses were destroyed, leaving about 1.2 million people homeless. 40% of the national hospital infrastructure was destroyed, while other health facilities also suffered substantial damage.

International reaction 

Immediately after the earthquake, the then president Kjell Eugenio Laugerud García invited most of the foreign ambassadors to tour the affected regions by helicopter, which prompted them to quickly ask for help in their home countries. For example, the United States of America rebuilt most of the roads, and Canada and Belgium each rebuilt a village.

Within days of the initial rupture the USGS sent a team of geologist to document the fault rupture and its effects. This team headed by George Plafker traveled the entire length of the fault by helicopter and was able to clearly trace its location. During this expedition several thousand photographs were collected including 1:10,000 aierial photographs collected by plane. In 2021 this analog data was digitized and georeferenced in order to build a database to assist in relocating the initial rupture location. During the summer of 2021 a team of geologist successfully relocated the fault rupture at 10 different locations. At the locations no evidence of post 1976 fault creep was observed.

Aftershocks 
Several aftershocks, ranging from 5.2 to 5.8  caused additional casualties and hampered relief efforts.

Source: Wayerly Person, William Spence, and James W. Dewey. Main event and principal aftershocks from teleseismic data. In: Guatemalan Earthquake of February 4, 1976, A Preliminary Report.

In popular culture
Scenes of the earthquake's aftermath, filmed on February 6, 1976, were featured in the Italian Mondo film Savana violenta, directed by Antonio Climati and Mario Morra.

Image gallery

See also
List of earthquakes in 1976
List of earthquakes in Guatemala

Notes

References

External links 

USGS Map
Guatemala Earthquake 1976 – photos and personal accounts

Guatemala Earthquake, 1976
Earth
1976 Guatemala
History of Guatemala
February 1976 events in North America